Misr Diwan Chand  was a notable officer and a powerful general of Maharaja Ranjit Singh's reign. He rose from petty clerk to the Chief of Artillery and Commander-in-chief of the armies that conquered Multan and Kashmir and also served as the Commander-in-Chief of Khalsa Army from 1816 to 1825. and was a notable pillar of the state.

Early life
Diwan Chand was the son of a  Brahmin shopkeeper of Gondlanwala village (in present-day Gujranwala,Pakistan).

Military career
Diwan Chand was honoured with the title of Zafar-Jang-Bahadur—Brave Victor of Battles from Maharaja Ranjit Singh. Diwan Chand rose from the post of Artillery Chief to the Chief Commander of Khalsa Army in 1816. He suppressed the rebellion of Tiwana nawab of Mitha Tiwana and forced him to pay tribute. Diwan Chand captured Multan in 1818 governor Muzzafar Khan and seven of his sons were killed. In 1819, he led an expedition to Shopian in Kashmir region and conquered it from Durrani governor Jabbar Khan. He defeated the afghans in Some hours.Took Mankera present day Mankera Tehsil in 1821 and he also conquered Batala, Pathankot, Mukerian, Akalgarh etc., he also took part in the conquest of Peshawar and Nowshera.

Maharaja Ranjit Singh had a great regard for the general. Once at Amritsar, the Maharaja had purchased a very precious hookah from a Hindustani merchant, although this was against the injunctions of his own religion. He presented the hookah to Misr Diwan Chand to mark the high esteem in which he was held by the Maharaja. Permission was also given to him to smoke. 

The contribution of Misr Dewan Chand in the making of the Maharaja's empire has also been under-estimated by British historians who have described him as a “hookah-smoking general'. It is a fact that Maharaja had once presented him a hookah himself.

Title
He was a great warrior and general who achieved the title of Fateh-o-Nusrat-Nasib (one who never lost in war) and Zafar-jang-Bahadur (conqueror in wars) from Maharaja Ranjit Singh himself and was made Governor of Kashmir.

References

People of the Sikh Empire
History of Punjab
Punjabi people